Tommo may refer to :
 Thomas "Tommo" Peaceful, the protagonist in Private Peaceful
 Tommo, a minor character from Hollyoaks
 Tommo, a video game publisher
 Tommo & Hawk, the second novel in Bryce Courtenay's Australian trilogy
 Tommo So, a Dogon dialect spoken in Mali